Suprarenal is an adjective that may refer to:

 Adrenal gland
 Suprarenal veins
 Suprarenal impression